{
    "type": "FeatureCollection",
    "features": [{
        "type": "Feature",
        "properties": {
            "shape": "Polygon",
            "maps": ["default-map"],
            "name": "Unnamed Layer",
            "category": "default",
            "id": "8e25e8d0-d6fd-48a6-8d26-eac4d31fa8bf"
        },
        "geometry": {
            "type": "Polygon",
            "coordinates": [
                [
                    [151.251789, -33.965021],
                    [151.25173, -33.964834],
                    [151.25181, -33.964652],
                    [151.252014, -33.964474],
                    [151.252561, -33.96406],
                    [151.252937, -33.963909],
                    [151.253216, -33.96386],
                    [151.253371, -33.9639],
                    [151.253216, -33.963793],
                    [151.253039, -33.963713],
                    [151.252867, -33.963722],
                    [151.252658, -33.963717],
                    [151.252491, -33.963771],
                    [151.252196, -33.963673],
                    [151.252025, -33.963722],
                    [151.251928, -33.96382],
                    [151.252121, -33.96394],
                    [151.252052, -33.964078],
                    [151.251875, -33.96426],
                    [151.25173, -33.964394],
                    [151.251639, -33.964705],
                    [151.251612, -33.964856],
                    [151.251644, -33.965008],
                    [151.251789, -33.965021]
                ]
            ]
        }
    }]
}
Malabar Beach is a beach in Malabar, New South Wales, Australia, located to the south of Maroubra Beach and to the north of Little Bay and La Perouse. The Randwick Golf Club is located on the cliffs on the right side and Malabar Headland on the cliffs on the left side. Its sands stretch for about 200 metres. You can find two boat ramps towards the both ends of the beach, as well as a rock pool further south, just below Randwick Golf Club.

History 
Malabar Beach was previously known as Long Bay beach. Following a petition by local residents, the new name was gazetted on 29 September 1933, following a shipwreck of the MV Malabar in 1931. There also have been four other shipwrecks on the headland - the St Albans in 1882, Try One in 1947 and SS Goolgwai in 1955 (and an unnamed barge in 1955).

Malabar Beach suffered issues with water pollution that affected health of the swimmers. For example, there was an outbreak of typhoid in one family who swam at Malabar Beach regularly. In 1957, 300 residents had a protest meeting in Cromwell Park nearby to raise the issue of the beach water pollution to the Sydney Water Board. In 1992 a marine outfall started pumping the sewage 4.2 km out to the sea, and water quality improved dramatically. Randwick Council lifeguards started patrolling the beach, and barbecue and playground were installed in Cromwell Park.

Geography 
The rocky headland on the left of the bay or the cliff, protect the beach from the waves so the water is very calm so swimming, snorkelling, scuba diving, kayaking and paddle boarding is easy to do at Malabar Beach although it gets deep suddenly. The beach is also shaped like a dolphin.

Dangers 
In the waters swim colourful fish but also small stingrays and blue ringed octopuses which lurk the waters. Malabar Beach is not patrolled with lifeguards or lifesavers although there is a lifeguard tower there.

References 

Tourist attractions in Sydney
Beaches of Sydney